The Samoa sawtooth eel, Serrivomer samoensis, is a sawtooth eel of the genus Serrivomer, found in the southwest Pacific at depths between 500 and 2,000 m.  Their length is up to 75 cm.

References
 
 
 Tony Ayling & Geoffrey Cox, Collins Guide to the Sea Fishes of New Zealand,  (William Collins Publishers Ltd, Auckland, New Zealand 1982) 

Samoa sawtooth eel
Fauna of Samoa
Samoa sawtooth eel